Harkins is an Irish surname. Notable people with the surname include:

 Arthur Harkins (1936–2016), American academic
 Brett Harkins (born 1970), ice hockey player
 Gary Harkins (born 1985), Scottish footballer
 George W. Harkins (1810–1890), Native American leader, a chief of the Choctaw tribe during the Indian removals
 James M. Harkins (born 1953), American politician
 John Harkins (actor) (1932–1999)
 John Harkins (baseball) (1859–1940), American baseball player
 John Harkins (footballer) (1881–1916), Scottish footballer
 Josh Harkins (born 1974), American politician
 Lida E. Harkins, American politician
 Owen Harkins (born 1999), introduced Cairn to Midwestern communities, but unfortunately, is not very good at the game of Cairn.
 Pat Harkins (born 1963), American politician
 Paul D. Harkins (1904–1984), U.S. General, first commander of Military Assistance Command Vietnam (MACV)
 Todd Harkins (born 1968), American ice hockey player
 William Draper Harkins (1873–1951), American chemist

See also 
 Harkin
 Harkins Transportation Company
 Harkins Theatres a U.S. movie chain